Zaglujeh may refer to:
 Zaglujeh, Abbas-e Sharqi
 Zaglujeh, Ujan-e Sharqi